Somolinos is a Spanish town of the county of Guadalajara and of the community of Castilla-La Mancha.

References

Municipalities in the Province of Guadalajara